Big Shot in the Dark is the fourth album by the American band Timbuk 3, released in 1991. "Mudflap Girl" was released as a single.

Production
 Big Shot in the Dark was Timbuk 3's first album as a four-piece band. Courtney Audain played bass and steel drums, and Wally Ingram served as the drummer/percussionist. "The Border Crossing" was inspired by the fall of the Berlin Wall. Evan Johns played guitar on "Mudflap Girl".

Critical reception

The Chicago Tribune called Timbuk 3 "a distinctly American band both in its spare, rootsy rock sound and its thematic obsession with the American dream gone awry." The Calgary Herald deemed the album "Timbuk 3 at its twangy, idiosyncratic best."

Kenneth Bays of AllMusic wrote: "On their fourth album, Timbuk 3 officially became a foursome ... there's a newfound sense of instrumental adventurousness all around. ('49 Plymouth' employs a lute, while an instrumental version of 'Sunshine' is played on steel drums)... Big Shot in the Dark has a bluesy, droning quality throughout, a vibe that would be amplified further on Timbuk 3's 1994 EP Looks Like Dark to Me."

Track listing
All songs written by Pat MacDonald, except where noted.
 God Made an Angel
 Sunshine
 Two Medicines (Barbara K. MacDonald)
 The Border Crossing (Barbara K. MacDonald)
 Big Shot in the Dark
 Mudflap Girl
 Dis•••land (Was Made for You & Me)
 Wake Up Little Darlin'
 '49 Plymouth
 The Little Things
 Sunshine (Instrumental)

Personnel
Timbuk 3
Pat MacDonald: Vocals, Electric and Acoustic Guitars, Harmonica, Lute, Sampler
Barbara K. MacDonald: Vocals, Electric Guitars, Violin, Percussion, Keyboards and Programming
Courtney Audain: Bass, Keyboards, Steel Drums, Various Other Percussion
Wally Ingram: Drums, Percussion, Handclaps

Additional Personnel
Liz Harrah: Organ on track 1
Evan Johns: Lead and Slide Guitar on track 6
Gary Moon: Hand claps
John Treanor: Washboard on tracks 3, 4, and 9

Production
Arranged and produced by Pat and Barbara K. MacDonald
Recording by Gary Moon; technical assistance by David Roach
Mixed by David Tickle (The Bunker, Malibu)
Mastered by Alan Yoshida at The Mastering Lab

References

Timbuk 3 albums
1991 albums
I.R.S. Records albums